Bechir Sahbani (born 22 October 1972) is a Tunisian former footballer who played as a defender. He made 30 appearances for the Tunisia national team from 1994 to 1999. He was also named in Tunisia's squad for the 1998 African Cup of Nations tournament.

References

External links
 

1972 births
Living people
Footballers from Tunis
Tunisian footballers
Association football defenders
Tunisia international footballers
1998 African Cup of Nations players
Espérance Sportive de Tunis players
CA Bizertin players